Fumesua is a town in Ghana. It is 15 kilometres from the centre  Kumasi. It is a dormitory town. It serves mainly as a residential areas for workers in various companies in Kumasi. The town also host the Building and Road Research Institute of Ghana.

Boundaries
The town is bordered on the south by Ejisu, to the west by Anwomaso, to the north by Kentinkrono and to the east by Oduom.

References

Populated places in Kumasi Metropolitan Assembly